"Love Ain't Gonna Wait for You" is a song by British pop group S Club and the last single by the band, released on their final studio album Seeing Double and included on the compilation Best: The Greatest Hits of S Club 7. It was released in United Kingdom on 26 May 2003 as double A-side with "Say Goodbye". In other countries, only "Say Goodbye" was released as single.

Music video
This video is a montage, incorporating scenes from the Seeing Double movie (which the song features in) along with shots from all their previous music videos, series of their TV show and the Carnival 2002 arena tour.

Track listings
 UK CD1 and Australasian CD single
 "Say Goodbye"
 "Love Ain't Gonna Wait for You" (single remix)
 "Special Kind of Something"
 "Say Goodbye" (video)
 Goodbye messages from Rachel, Tina and Bradley (video)

 UK CD2
 "Say Goodbye"
 "Bitter Sweet"
 "Love Ain't Gonna Wait for You" (video)
 Goodbye messages from Jon, Jo and Hannah (video)

 UK cassette single
 "Say Goodbye"
 "Love Ain't Gonna Wait for You" (Illicit vocal mix)

Credits and personnel
Credits are lifted from the UK CD1 liner notes.

Studios
 Produced at Strongroom Studios (London, England)
 Engineered and mixed at The Aquarium (London, England)
 Mastered at Transfermation (London, England)

Personnel

 Simon Ellis – writing, programming, production
 Sheppard Solomon – writing
 David Rainger – guitars
 Simon Hill – additional drum programming
 Nick Ingman – string arrangement, conducting
 Gavyn Wright – concertmaster
 Isobel Griffiths Ltd. – orchestra contracting
 Dan Frampton – production
 Stephen Lipson – additional production, additional programming
 Heff Moraes – mixing, engineering
 Richard Dowling – mastering

Charts
All entries charted with "Say Goodbye".

Weekly charts

Year-end charts

Release history

References

2003 singles
2003 songs
Number-one singles in Scotland
S Club 7 songs
Song recordings produced by Simon Ellis (record producer)
Songs written by Sheppard Solomon
Songs written by Simon Ellis (record producer)